Makaryevsky (masculine), Makaryevskaya (feminine), or Makaryevskoye (neuter) is the name of several rural localities in Russia:
Makaryevskoye, Altai Krai, a selo in Ust-Kazhinsky Selsoviet of Krasnogorsky District of Altai Krai
Makaryevskoye, Kurgan Oblast, a village in Peskovsky Selsoviet of Dalmatovsky District of Kurgan Oblast
Makaryevskoye, Nizhny Novgorod Oblast, a selo in Makaryevsky Selsoviet of Vetluzhsky District of Nizhny Novgorod Oblast
Makaryevskaya, Irkutsk Oblast, a village in Nukutsky District of Irkutsk Oblast
Makaryevskaya, Leningrad Oblast, a village in Vinnitskoye Settlement Municipal Formation of Podporozhsky District of Leningrad Oblast
Makaryevskaya, Tver Oblast, a village in Kalyazinsky District of Tver Oblast
Makaryevskaya, Vologda Oblast, a village in Pyazhozersky Selsoviet of Babayevsky District of Vologda Oblast